Alston is an unincorporated community in Columbia County in the U.S. state of Oregon. It lies along U.S. Route 30 (Lower Columbia River Highway) between Rainier and Clatskanie. Old Rainier Road and Alston–Mayger Road intersect Route 30 at Alston.

References

Unincorporated communities in Columbia County, Oregon
Unincorporated communities in Oregon